Amoeba Music is an American independent music store chain with locations in Berkeley, San Francisco, and Hollywood, Los Angeles, California. It was founded in 1990 in Berkeley, California, and remains in operation, having survived the decline of CD sales in the 2000s.

History

Original Berkeley store (1990) 
Amoeba Music was founded by former employees of nearby Rasputin Records and opened on Telegraph Avenue in Berkeley in 1990. Cofounders include but are not limited to Marc Weinstein, Dave Prinz, Yvonne Prinz, and Kent Randolph. The iconic Amoeba logo was designed by comic book artist Shepherd Hendrix. Primarily operating on reselling used goods, Amoeba has survived the decline of CD sales since the early 2000s with its trade-in program and the advent of the vinyl revival.

Second store (San Francisco, 1997) 

A second location, in San Francisco, opened on November 15, 1997, in the Haight-Ashbury neighborhood near Golden Gate Park. It is located in the former  Park Bowl bowling alley. It regularly stocks upwards of 100,000 CDs, vinyl records, and audio cassettes, both new and used.

Third store (Los Angeles, 2001) 
A third location, in Los Angeles, opened on November 17, 2001, on Sunset Boulevard at Cahuenga Boulevard in Hollywood. At the time of its opening, the store planned to stock as many as 250,000 titles, which would have placed it among the largest independent music stores in the world. According to Los Angeles Times writer Michael Hiltzik, the location "instantly became a Hollywood landmark." 

Amoeba's world music department was headed by Robert Leaver, co-founder of the Round World Music record shop and label in San Francisco. He also worked as a buyer of international records for Amoeba's Berkeley location.
The stores also trade-in movies, though secondarily to their music business. Each location has a smaller collection of movies on DVD, VHS, Laserdisc, and Blu-ray. In addition, each store maintains a selection of music-related posters and artwork for purchase, as well as Amoeba-branded merchandise. The Sunset Boulevard store had an entire second floor dedicated to DVD and Blu-ray at its original location. In addition, Amoeba Music frequently held free shows during store hours with locally- and nationally-known artists from a wide variety of genres.

In 2015, Amoeba sold the Sunset Boulevard property to a holding company but continued to lease the space. In 2018, it was announced that the owners would demolish the site and replace it with a contemporary glass-and-steel tower with residential units and commercial space, and Amoeba would be moving. On April 27, 2020, Amoeba announced that due to the COVID-19 pandemic, the Sunset Boulevard location was closed permanently ahead of schedule. Along with the statewide stay-at-home order issued by California governor Gavin Newsom in the COVID-19 pandemic, many non-essential stores were told to close to prevent spread of COVID-19. Amoeba subsequently started a fundraising campaign on GoFundMe to pay the bills as most of their income is derived from in-store purchases.

Relocated Los Angeles store (2021) 

Amoeba found a new location for its Los Angeles store on Hollywood Boulevard at Argyle Avenue. The store's vast collections of music CDs, LPs, DVDs, and books were temporarily in storage during construction at the new site during 2020 and 2021. The new location opened on April 1, 2021. 

The new Amoeba Music store is located near the popular Pantages Theatre in the Hollywood and Vine area. Continuing the tradition of free live shows for customers at the store, the new Amoeba Music frequently holds free shows during store hours with locally- and nationally-known artists from a wide variety of genres. The band Red Hot Chili Peppers gave a free live performance at the store for Amoeba Music customers after receiving a star on the Hollywood Walk of Fame near the entrance to Amoeba Music store on March 31, 2022. George Clinton, Woody Harrelson, and Bob Forrest unveiled the star at the ceremony.

YouTube channel 
Amoeba's YouTube channel was created on January 27, 2006, and is home to interviews, recordings of live performances at Amoeba locations, and the Webby Award–winning series What’s In My Bag? with various "featuring artists and tastemakers sharing what they found shopping at Amoeba."

Popular culture 
The Hollywood store was included as a playable venue in the 2008 music game Guitar Hero World Tour. Paul McCartney recorded his EP Amoeba's Secret (which was also released as Amoeba Gig in its entirety in 2019) at an unannounced live performance at the Hollywood location on June 27, 2007.

Gallery

References

External links 
 Official homepage of Amoeba Music
 
 
 "S.F. Music Landmark Headed to Sunset - Brief Article". (November 13, 2000.) Christopher Keough. Los Angeles Business Journal. Retrieved 2005-11-28.
 "Golden State: Record Chain Bets on the Past, Future". (November 17, 2005.) Michael Hiltzik. Los Angeles Times (and accompanying Golden State Blog.).
 "Amoeba Music's Simple Formula". (February 17, 2005). BusinessWeek.

Companies based in Berkeley, California
Music retailers of the United States
Retail companies established in 1990
1990 establishments in California
Landmarks in Los Angeles
Music of the San Francisco Bay Area
Buildings and structures in Hollywood, Los Angeles
Retail companies based in California